Henry Michael Foley (1917–1982) was an American
experimental physicist.

He was a professor and a leading physicist at Columbia University, later serving as chairman of the physics department. In 1948, Polykarp Kusch, working with Henry Foley, discovered the anomalous magnetic dipole moment of the electron. He served on the JASON Defense Advisory Group, an independent group of scientists which advises the United States Government on matters of science and technology. He also served on the MX Missile Basing advisory panel.

References

External links
 Biography of Henry Michael Foley (American Institute of Physics) 
 Henry Foley, Professor Of Physics at Columbia (The New York Times, August 20, 1982)

1917 births
1982 deaths
Columbia University faculty
Fellows of the American Physical Society